The Silver Jubilee was a named train of the London & North Eastern Railway (LNER).

History
The high average speed was maintained by running at high speeds uphill.

The train was made in the year of King George V's Silver Jubilee, and was painted silver throughout. It was composed of two twin-set articulated coaches, and one triplet-set; seven coaches in all.

On 6 November 1935, the newlywed Duke and Duchess of Gloucester travelled on Silver Jubilee from St Pancras to Kettering for a honeymoon at nearby Boughton House, one of the bride's family homes.

In February 1938, an eighth coach was inserted into the third class twin set, bringing the total to eight coaches.

The train set a new standard for speed in Britain at that time. Service continued until the outbreak of the Second World War in 1939.

Technical details

Engine and train: total length 
Total weight: .

Revival

See also
The Coronation
East Anglian

References

Silver Jubilee of George V
Silver Jubilee of Elizabeth II
Named passenger trains of the London and North Eastern Railway
Railway services introduced in 1935
Railway services discontinued in 1939
Railway services introduced in 1977
Railway services discontinued in 1977